The Barcelona School of Film was a 1960s group of Catalan filmmakers, concerned with the disruption of daily life by the unexpected, whose stylistic affinities lie with the pop art movement of the same years.

Overview
Their aim was to move away from the social realist films that had become associated with the New Spanish Cinema. They took cues from the French New Wave. The most important representative of the Barcelona School of Film was Vicente Aranda with his film Fata Morgana (1965).

From the so-called Escuela de Barcelona, originally more experimentalist and cosmopolitan, come Vicente Aranda, Jaime Camino, and Gonzalo Suárez, who made their master works in the 1980s.

References

Organisations based in Barcelona
Cinema of Catalonia